Roberto Blanco (legal name: Roberto Zerquera Blanco), was born 7 June 1937 in Tunis, Tunisia. Of Afro-Cuban origin, Blanco is a German Schlager singer, actor, and entertainer.

Early life
Blanco is the son of Cuban folklorist and artist Alfonso Zerquera and his wife Mercedes Blanco. He grew up in Beirut and Madrid. When Roberto was two, his mother died. After finishing school he began to study medicine in Madrid, but quit after two semesters.

Career
In 1957, Blanco played a role in the movie Der Stern von Afrika (The Star of Africa). His singing career began with Josephine Baker. In the 1960s, he became a hit star in his own right and appeared in various films – among them Johannes Mario Simmel penned All People Will Be Brothers and the Erich Kästner adaptation Three Men in the Snow.

In 1969, Blanco won the German "Schlager-Festspiele" with his song "Heute so, morgen so" (Today like this, tomorrow like that). Following that, Blanco recorded a number of hit albums. His music career peaked in 1972 with the song "Ein bisschen Spass muss sein" (A little fun must be) and "Der Puppenspieler von Mexiko" (The Puppeteer of Mexico). Since then he has appeared on numerous music and variety TV shows, most frequently on ZDF's Hitparade.

Singles
1957 – "Jesebell"
1957 – "Ob schwarz, ob weiß"
1963 – "Twistin' mit Monika"
1968 – "Tschumbala-Bey"
1968 – "Jennifer"
1969 – "Heute so, morgen so"
1969 – "Auf Liebe gibt es keine Garantie"
1970 – "Auf dem Kurfürstendam sagt man "Liebe""
1970 – "San Bernadino"
1971 – "Las Vegas"
1972 – "Ich komm' zurück nach Amarillo"
1972 – "Der Puppenspieler von Mexiko"
1972 – "Ein bisschen Spaß muss sein"
1973 – "Ich bin ein glücklicher Mann"
1973 – "Pappi, lauf doch nicht so schnell"
1974 – "In El Paso"
1976 – "Bye Bye, Fräulein"
1977 – "Morgen sind wir reich"
1978 – "Porompompom"
1978 – "Hey Mama Ho"
1978 – "Viva Maria"
1978 – "Wer trinkt schon gern den Wein allein"
1979 – "Der Clap Clap Song"
1979 – "Samba si! Arbeit no!"
1979 – "Am Tag, als es kein Benzin mehr gab"
1980 – "Rock 'n' Roll ist gut für die Figur"
1981 – "Humanaho (Alle Menschen sind Brüder)"
1990 – "Resi bring Bier" (duet with Tony Marshall)
1992 – "Limbo auf Jamaika" (duet with Tony Marshall)
1996 – "Da ist die Tür" (feat. Lotto King Karl)
1999 – "Last Christmas" (with Frank Luis y su traditional Habana Orchester)
2001 – "Born to Be Alive" (with The Disco Boys)
2004 – "Ein bisschen Spaß muss sein" (new version with Captain Jack)

Selected filmography
 The Bloody Vultures of Alaska (1973)

References

External links
 

1937 births
Living people
People from Tunis
Spanish emigrants to Germany
German male singers
German people of Cuban descent
Spanish-language singers of Germany